This is a list of elections in Canada in 2008. Included are provincial, municipal and federal elections, by-elections on any level, referendums and party leadership races at any level.

March
 3 March: 2008 Alberta general election
 17 March: 2008 Canadian federal by-elections

May
 12 May: 2008 New Brunswick municipal elections
 12 May: 2008 Quebec provincial by-elections

June
 25 June: Saskatchewan provincial by-election in Cumberland.

August
 27 August: Newfoundland and Labrador provincial by-elections in Baie Verte-Springdale and Cape St. Francis

September
 22 September: Quebec provincial by-election in Jean-Talon

October
 14 October: 2008 Canadian federal election
 18 October: 2008 Progressive Conservative Party of New Brunswick leadership election
 18 October: 2008 Nova Scotia municipal elections
 26 October: Municipal by-election in Orée-du-Parc District, Gatineau, Quebec. 
 27 October: 2008 Nunavut general election
 29 October: British Columbia provincial by-elections in Vancouver-Burrard and Vancouver-Fairview

November
 3 November: provincial by-election in New Maryland-Sunbury West, New Brunswick
 5 November: Saskatchewan municipal elections for odd-numbered rural municipalities
 15 November: 2008 British Columbia municipal elections

December
 1 December: Nunavut municipal elections, 2008 (hamlets)
 8 December: 2008 Quebec general election
 8 December: Northwest Territories municipal elections, 2008 (hamlets)

See also
Municipal elections in Canada
Elections in Canada